Loučeň is a market town in Nymburk District in the Central Bohemian Region of the Czech Republic. It has about 1,400 inhabitants.

Administrative parts
Villages of Patřín, Studce and Studečky are administrative parts of Loučeň.

Geography
It lies on the border of the Jizera Table and Central Elbe Table.

History
The first written mention of Loučeň is in a deed of Bishop Peregrin from 1223, when an owner of a fortress in Loučeň was mentioned.

Sights

Loučeň is known for the Loučeň Castle. The Baroque castle was built on the site of a dilapidated medieval fortress in 1703–1714. Today it is open to the public, and partially serves as a hotel. The castle also includes a large castle park with a set of labyrinths.

Next to the castle a chapel was built, later rebuilt to the Church of the Assumption of the Virgin Mary.

References

External links

Market towns in the Czech Republic